The National University of Río Negro is a public institution of higher learning located in Río Negro Province, Argentina, and established in 2007 as part of a plan to geographically diversify Argentina's National University system.

The university maintains campuses throughout Río Negro Province, one of Argentina's most-sparsely populated: Bariloche, Choele Choel, El Bolsón, General Roca, San Antonio Oeste, Viedma, and Villa Regina. The school offers 25 undergraduate courses and one post-graduate.

See also
Science and Education in Argentina
Argentine Higher Education Official Site
Argentine Universities

References

2007 establishments in Argentina
Argentine national universities
Educational institutions established in 2007
National University of Río Negro